Yuchi Township (also known as Yuchih) is a rural township in the center of Nantou County, Taiwan.

History
The area is home to the Thao people who live near Sun Moon Lake. The township was formerly called Go-sia-po

Administrative divisions
The township comprises 13 villages: Dalin, Dayan, Gonghe, Riyue, Shuishe, Toushe, Tungchi, Tungguang, Wucheng, Wudeng, Xincheng, Yuchi and Zhongming.

Tourist attractions
 Ci En Pagoda
 Dajhu Lake Waterbirds Reserve
 Formosan Aboriginal Culture Village
 Jinlong Mountain
 Kong-ming Temple
 Lalu Island
 Peacock Park
 Shuei-she Mountain
 Sun Moon Lake
 Wen Wu Temple
 Tataka Visitor Center
 Xuanzang Temple

Transportation
 Provincial Highway No. 21 goes through Yuchi.
 Sun Moon Lake Ropeway
 Shuishe Pier

Notable natives
 Lin Yang-kang, President of Judicial Yuan (1987–1994)
 Tang Huo-shen, member of Legislative Yuan (2002–2008)

References

External links

Yuchi Township Office

Townships in Nantou County